Iroda Tulyaganova (born 7 January 1982) is a former professional tennis player from Uzbekistan.

Tulyaganova has career-high WTA rankings of 16 in singles (reached in June 2002) and 28 in doubles (September 2002). She won three singles titles and four doubles titles on the WTA Tour.

Tulyaganova retired from professional tennis in 2010.

Career
She returned to the main tour in 2006 after a long injury absence, and in Kolkata in September 2006, she reached the semifinals as a qualifier, leaping more than 120 places in the rankings to No. 222 after her success. The following week, she reached the final of her home event in Tashkent, beating a string of players including top 60-ranked Olga Poutchkova. She also won the women's singles gold medal in the 2002 Asian Games in Busan by defeating Tamarine Tanasugarn of Thailand, and the mixed-doubles bronze medal in the same event.

WTA Tour career finals

Singles: 7 (3–4)

Doubles: 7 (4–3)

ITF finals

Singles (3–2)

Doubles (4–4)

External links

 Official website
 
 
 

1982 births
Living people
Olympic tennis players of Uzbekistan
Sportspeople from Tashkent
Tennis players at the 2000 Summer Olympics
Uzbekistani female tennis players
Uzbeks
Asian Games medalists in tennis
Hopman Cup competitors
US Open (tennis) junior champions
Wimbledon junior champions
Grand Slam (tennis) champions in girls' singles
Grand Slam (tennis) champions in girls' doubles
Tennis players at the 1998 Asian Games
Tennis players at the 2002 Asian Games
Tennis players at the 2006 Asian Games
Tennis players at the 2018 Asian Games
Asian Games gold medalists for Uzbekistan
Asian Games bronze medalists for Uzbekistan
Medalists at the 2002 Asian Games
Medalists at the 2006 Asian Games